Joe McBride (born 7 August 1960) is a Scottish former professional footballer who played for several clubs, including Everton, Rotherham United, Hibernian, and Dundee. McBride's father, also named Joe, was a prolific goalscorer during the 1960s.

Playing career
Born in Glasgow, McBride junior started his career with Everton in the late 1970s, and he scored on his debut for the club, against Bolton. After spells with Rotherham and Oldham, McBride signed for Hibernian in 1985. McBride's new manager was John Blackley, who had played with McBride's father for Hibs during the late 1960s and early 1970s. His most significant contribution for Hibs was scoring two goals in an Edinburgh derby at Tynecastle. McBride subsequently had spells with Dundee, East Fife, Albion Rovers, Livingston and Hamilton.

Coaching career
McBride became a coach during his time at Albion Rovers, and was made caretaker manager when Jimmy Crease resigned as manager in December 1995. He subsequently became a youth coach at Celtic, developing players including Aiden McGeady, and Cillian Sheridan. A reorganisation of Celtic's coaching staff in 2008 meant that McBride left the club.

McBride subsequently assisted Willie McStay at Újpest FC in Budapest, Hungary and in June 2010, joined Watford as a youth coach, working under the management of fellow Scot Malky Mackay. McBride followed Mackay to Cardiff City and was appointed first team coach on 30 June 2011.

On 3 October 2014, McBride was named as Hibernian under-20 player development coach.

As of 2018, he was the dedicated coach for the Scottish Football Association's Performance Schools project based at Holyrood Secondary School in south Glasgow.

References

Sources

External links 
 

1960 births
Albion Rovers F.C. players
Celtic F.C. non-playing staff
Dundee F.C. players
East Fife F.C. players
Everton F.C. players
Association football midfielders
Hamilton Academical F.C. players
Hibernian F.C. players
Living people
Livingston F.C. players
Oldham Athletic A.F.C. players
Footballers from Glasgow
Rotherham United F.C. players
Scottish Football League players
Scottish footballers
English Football League players
Watford F.C. non-playing staff
Cardiff City F.C. non-playing staff
Scotland under-21 international footballers
Hibernian F.C. non-playing staff